A by-election was held for the New South Wales Legislative Assembly electorate of Cumberland North Riding on 19 June 1856 because John Darvall had been appointed Solicitor General in the Donaldson ministry.

Dates

Result

The by-election was caused by the appointment of John Darvall as Solicitor General in the Donaldson ministry.

See also
Electoral results for the district of Cumberland (North Riding)
List of New South Wales state by-elections

References

1856 elections in Australia
New South Wales state by-elections
1850s in New South Wales